Monroe Senior High School is a high school in Monroe, Ohio.

References

External links
District website
Monroe Jr./Sr. High School
District History website

High schools in Butler County, Ohio
Public high schools in Ohio